Harold King (1904-1978) was an Australian rugby league footballer who played in the 1920s.

Harry King came to St. George from Main Arm, near Mullumbimby, New South Wales in 1922 during the club's second season in the NSWRFL. King played his junior football with Mullumbimby Rugby Union Club with his best mate Vic Armbruster. Harry King stayed two seasons at Saints before joining Eastern Suburbs in 1925 for a season before heading back to Queensland to get married in 1926.

Harry King died in August 1978 in Buderim, Queensland

References

St. George Dragons players
Australian rugby league players
1904 births
1978 deaths
Sydney Roosters players
Rugby league fullbacks
Rugby league players from New South Wales